The Shrubs were an English rock music group, formed in Watford in 1985, releasing three albums before splitting up in 1989.

History
Future Shrubs singer Nick Hobbs had previously managed Henry Cow and after living in Stockholm for a year joined Swedish band Kraeldjursanstalten. When that band split up he relocated to London and looked for a new band. After being sacked from Stump for "being too serious", Hobbs formed his own band, taking inspiration from Captain Beefheart, Pere Ubu, The Fall, and The Ex, initially as The Kevin Staples Band, but changing name to The Shrubs before first release Full Steam Into The Brainstorm, a 6-track 12" EP in July 1986 on the Ron Johnson label.  Bassist Phil Roberts left shortly afterwards to join Marc Riley in The Creepers, to be replaced by Steve Brockway, and subsequently by Mark Grebby, who had been the bass player for original Ron Johnson artistes Splat!

Shrubs contributed Bullfighters Bones to the NME's famous C86 album.

A further 12", Blackmailer followed towards the end of the year, with debut album Take Me Aside For A Midnight Harangue hitting the shops in July 1987.  With the collapse of the Ron Johnson label and the indie distribution network The Cartel, several hundred copies of "Harangue" were incinerated, much to Hobbs' annoyance. Shrubs signed with the Hertfordshire-based Public Domain label for a studio/live 12", Another Age, and second and final album Vessels Of The Heart, both in 1988, after which the band split. Hobbs went on to form Mecca, who toured the former Soviet Union with Nitzer Ebb and others, and subsequently Infidel, along with current Pere Ubu guitarist Keith Moliné and Nico's former drummer Graham Dowdall (a.k.a. Dids), at the same time carrying on in artist management. He carries on making music solo and with different groups under the name of Nikolai Galen.

The band recorded two sessions for John Peel's BBC Radio 1 show, the first in June 1986 and the second in August 1987.

Discography

Singles
 "Full Steam Into The Brainstorm" (Jul 1986, Ron Johnson, ZRON10 [12"])
 "Blackmailer" (Dec 1986, Ron Johnson, ZRON17 [12"])

Albums
 Take Me Aside for a Midnight Harangue (Jun 1987, Ron Johnson, ZRON23  [LP])
 Another Age/live tracks (Sep 1988, Public Domain, DOM001 [12" mini-LP])
 Vessels of The Heart (Nov 1988, Public Domain, DOM002 [LP])

References

English rock music groups